Parliamentary elections were held in Yugoslavia in 1969. The Socio-Political Council was elected on 13 April, the three Councils of Working Communities were elected on 23 April, and the Council of Nationalities was elected on 6, 7, 8 and 9 May.

Background
The elections were held following amendments to the 1963 constitution made in December 1968.

Electoral system
The Federal Assembly consisted of five chambers:
the Socio-Political Council, whose 120 members were directly elected in single member constituencies. Candidates required a plurality of the votes when opposed. When unopposed, they required the votes of at least 50% of the registered voters. If this was not achieved, a second round was held.
the Council of Nationalities, which had 140 members elected by the Provincial Assemblies. The Assemblies of Bosnia and Herzegovina, Croatia, Macedonia, Montenegro, Serbia and Slovenia each elected twenty members, whilst the Assemblies of Kosovo and Vojvodina elected ten each.
the three Councils of Working Communities, each of which had 120 members elected by delegates from their industries.
the Economic Council, whose members were elected by those directly or indirectly employed in "craftsmanship, agriculture, banking, commerce, hotel trade, industry, press and publishing, communal services, transport and scientific research associated with these fields.
the Educational and Cultural Council, whose members were elected by those directly or indirectly employed in the arts, education, science or sport.
the Council for Social Affairs and Health, whose members were elected by those directly or indirectly employed in social insurance, medical research, medical science or social services.

Results

Socio-Political Council

Councils of Working Communities

References

Yugoslavia
Elections in Yugoslavia
Parliamentary election
Yugoslavian parliamentary election
One-party elections